Künten is a municipality in the district of Baden in the canton of Aargau in Switzerland. It lies on the Reuss River and includes the previously independent community of Sulz, which merged with Künten in 1973.

History
Künten is first mentioned around 1101-50 as Chünten though this comes from a 14th Century copy of the original document.

Geography

Of this area, 56.3% is used for agricultural purposes, while 26.9% is forested. Of the rest of the land, 12.7% is settled (buildings or roads) and the remainder (4.1%) is non-productive (rivers or lakes).

The municipality is located in the Baden district.  It consists of the village of Künten on the Bremgarten-Fislisbach road and the village of Sulz along the Reuss river valley.

Coat of arms
The blazon of the municipal coat of arms is Per pale Argent a Latin Cross pattee couped and Gules a Bend Wavy Argent.

Demographics
, 13.7% of the population was made up of foreign nationals. Over the last 10 years the population has grown at a rate of 5.7%. Most of the population speaks German (93.1%), with Albanian being second most common ( 1.5%) and Turkish being third ( 0.9%).

The age distribution, in Künten is; 169 children or 10.5% of the population are between 0 and 9 years old and 210 teenagers or 13.0% are between 10 and 19.  Of the adult population, 207 people or 12.8% of the population are between 20 and 29 years old.  210 people or 13.0% are between 30 and 39, 309 people or 19.1% are between 40 and 49, and 222 people or 13.7% are between 50 and 59.  The senior population distribution is 167 people or 10.3% of the population are between 60 and 69 years old, 81 people or 5.0% are between 70 and 79, there are 36 people or 2.2% who are between 80 and 89,and there are 4 people or 0.2% who are 90 and older.

, there were 34 homes with 1 or 2 persons in the household, 199 homes with 3 or 4 persons in the household, and 294 homes with 5 or more persons in the household.  The average number of people per household was 2.71 individuals.   there were 316 single family homes (or 48.8% of the total) out of a total of 648 homes and apartments.

In the 2007 federal election the most popular party was the SVP which received 44.8% of the vote.  The next three most popular parties were the CVP (20.6%), the FDP (10.7%) and the SP (10.5%).

The entire Swiss population is generally well educated.  In Künten about 78.6% of the population (between age 25-64) have completed either non-mandatory upper secondary education or additional higher education (either university or a Fachhochschule).  Of the school age population, there are 123 students attending primary school, there are 55 students attending secondary school in the municipality.

The historical population is given in the following table:

Heritage sites of national significance
The mill at Mühlegasse 2 is listed as a Swiss heritage site of national significance.

Economy
, Künten had an unemployment rate of 1.33%.  , there were 48 people employed in the primary economic sector and about 17 businesses involved in this sector.  155 people are employed in the secondary sector and there are 14 businesses in this sector.  120 people are employed in the tertiary sector, with 37 businesses in this sector.

 there was a total of 825 workers who lived in the municipality.  Of these, 649 or about 78.7% of the residents worked outside Künten while 131 people commuted into the municipality for work.  There were a total of 307 jobs (of at least 6 hours per week) in the municipality.

Religion

Of the rest of the population, there are 4 individuals (or about 0.27% of the population) who belong to the Christian Catholic faith.

References

External links

 

Municipalities of Aargau
Cultural property of national significance in Aargau